Here is a complete list of songs by the South Korean band N.Flying.

0–9

A

B

C

D

E

F

G

H

I

J

K

L

M

O

P

R

S

T

U

V

W

Y

Z

References 

N.Flying